Immaculata is a title of the Virgin Mary referring to the Catholic doctrine of the Immaculate Conception.

Immaculata may also refer to:

Species of animals
Deloneura immaculata, a species of butterfly endemic to South Africa
Hyla immaculata, a species of frog endemic to China
Hafferia immaculata, a species of antbird in South and Central America
Platythelphusa immaculata, a species of freshwater crabs endemic to Lake Tanganyika
Scutigerella immaculata, the garden centipede

Schools and universities
Immaculata University, a Catholic University in East Whiteland Township, Chester County, Pennsylvania

Other uses 
Immaculata (statue), a Baroque plague column in Košice, Slovakia
Immaculata Church, a Roman Catholic church in Cincinnati, Ohio
Immaculata prayer, a Roman Catholic prayer to Mary composed by Saint Maximillian Kolbe

See also 
I. maculata (disambiguation)
Immaculate Conception (disambiguation)
Immacolata (disambiguation)
Militia Immaculatae, a Catholic religious association
Princess Maria Immaculata of Bourbon-Two Sicilies (disambiguation)